Pioneer Valley Christian Academy is a private, non-denominational Christian school in Springfield, Massachusetts, United States.  Founded in 1972, the school is accredited by the Association of Christian Schools International (ACSI) and the New England Association of Christian Schools (NEACS).  The school has over 350 students in pre-K through Grade 12.

On August 19, 2014, Pioneer Valley Christian School unveiled a new sign and logo. The new sign and logo highlight the name change to Pioneer Valley Christian Academy(PVCA) which school officials believe better reflects its academic offerings.

History
East Longmeadow Christian Day School opened in September 1972 in the facilities of the First Baptist Church of East Longmeadow, MA. Enrollment that year consisted of eighteen students in grades 1-4, a headmaster, and one teacher. As the school grew, additional grades were added, and in 1975 a high school for grades 9-12 was established.  In 1977, Harold Duff, the former president of Christian Schools, Inc. in Maine, joined the school as Headmaster.  Duff was the founder of Christian Schools, Inc. which included Glen Cove Christian Academy, Glen Cove Bible College, and Canaan Christian Elementary School
In 1985 the school moved to its present campus when it purchased the former Ursuline Academy campus. In 2002 six classrooms were added to the elementary wing. In 2009 a 17,000 square-foot addition was opened that included a science lab and lecture hall, art room, technology room, music rooms for choral and instrumental instruction, a multi-purpose room, and additional classrooms. In 2016 a 39,000 square-foot addition was completed adding a new gymnasium, training rooms, locker rooms, library and additional classrooms.

Campus

References

External links 
 School website
 Association of Christian Schools International

Christian schools in Massachusetts
Nondenominational Christian schools in the United States
Schools in Springfield, Massachusetts
Private elementary schools in Massachusetts
Private middle schools in Massachusetts
Private high schools in Massachusetts